Moor (meaning Mother) is a 2015 Pakistani drama film directed, written by Jami and co-produced by Nazira Ali, Nadeem Mandviwalla and Jami under the production banner of Azad Film Company and Mandviwalla Entertainment. The film stars Hameed Sheikh in lead along with Samiya Mumtaz, Shaz Khan, Nayyar Ejaz, Ayaz Samoo and Abdul Qadir in lead roles. The film's title, Moor, is a Pashto word meaning "Mother". Moor was previously named as Morqaye (maan  sahiba). Film's story depicts the railway system of Balochistan, especially the closure of Zhob valley railways in 1984. Besides that the movie shows how families are run by the women. According to the director of the movie, the film depicts living through the problems faced by Pakistan.

The film was released nationwide by Geo films on 14 August 2015 (Pakistan Independence Day). It was selected to premiere at 20th Busan International Film Festival. The film was selected as the Pakistani entry for the Best Foreign Language Film at the 88th Academy Awards but it was not nominated.

Plot
Recently widowed, Wahidullah Khan (Hameed Sheikh) is a troubled station-master at the Khost railway station on the fractured Bostan-Zhob tracks. The station, his sole source of income, has been reduced to a pitiable ruin due to the prevalence of a mafia which has caused several rifts in the Baluchistan railways. Using a combination of incentives and coercion, it acquires the land on which the tracks and stations were situated – and builds commercial and residential developments there. Additionally, it sells the steel, removed from the tracks, for a fortune. Wahid is in a predicament; torn between a verbal agreement to sell the station and tracks under his care to the mafia – including his brother, Zahir (Shabbir Rana), and gang leader, Lalu (Sultan Hussain) – and the last wishes of his deceased wife, Palwasha (Samiya Mumtaz). She vehemently opposed the deal, based on a strong conviction that this land keeps her family rooted.

Meanwhile, Wahid's son, Ehsaanullah Khan (Shaz Khan), has set out to turn his fortunes in Karachi, Pakistan's troubled megacity, only with the memory of his mother's guidance to use time to his advantage. Yet the city, which appeared to be a sweet promise of success from a distance, is more unforgiving than Balochistan's treacherous landscape; here, time is at no one's mercy.  Frustrated by his circumstances, Ehsaan chooses the more dishonourable trajectory to success, by getting involved in the corrupt, but highly lucrative, business of counterfeit documentation. He continues in the business even after his mother's passing, and a scandal that almost exposes him in the film's opening sequences. He is, nonetheless, persistently haunted by his conscience and his mother's upright values of honour and loyalty to the land.

Cast
 Hameed Sheikh as Wahid
 Shaz Khan as Ehsaanullah Khan
 Samiya Mumtaz as Palwasha
 Abdul Qadir as Baggoo Baba
 Shabbir Rana as Zahir
 Sultan Hussain as Lalu
 Ayaz Samoo as Imtisal
 Nayyar Ejaz as Talat
 Aliee Shaikh as FIA Officer 
 Soniya Hussain as Amber
 Eshita Mehboob Syed as Arzo
 Joshinder Chaggar as Sarah
 Omar as Asghar
 Zain Ullah as Dilawar

Production

Casting 
Earlier, Shabbir Rana was chosen for lead role in film but was later opted out to give room to Hameed Sheikh who met the physical challenges of the role. Sheikh was selected after Jami was struck by his entry in the film Kandahar Break. For female lead Samiya Mumtaz was asked to do the role. Despite being a comedian in field, Ayaz Samoo was cast for villain's role in film. Abdul Qadir is senior most actor in cast hails from Quetta. On his role in the film he stated "I’m from a people who know how to live in the mountains, but I can't swim. But Jami was able to make me do it. My fellow actors proved that they are no less than any other in the country." Moreover, this will be the first film of Soniya Hussain and can be considered a second film for Eshita Mehboob Syed.

Filming
The film was shot in Quetta, Muslim Bagh, Khanozai, Shelabagh, Bostan, Hyderabad, Sukkur and Karachi. Making of Moor began in 2007 at a time when train issues were worse in Pakistan. To write the script, director and crew decided to travel to Balochistan by train. He summoned the conditions as "The 10-11 hour journey took us two days on a train that had no windows, no bathrooms and barely functioning lights. The engine broke down multiple times, and the diesel ran out just as many. And oh, we couldn’t stand near the door, because “rocket launcher kabhi bhi asakta hai”. We couldn't have anticipated the serious issues that we saw. Shooting in Muslimbagh had trials of its own. Not only was the weather inclement, but we encountered lack of support from security forces who would intervene to tell us it's not safe. Surprisingly, the Taliban cooperated and even emptied out their headquarters for us to shoot in. Our crew included girls wearing Western clothes, and nobody cared."

Marketing 
The first look teaser was revealed online on 6 August 2013. The film release date was announced in a press conference held in Karachi where posters and theatrical trailer were also revealed. Film's final extended trailer was revealed on 7 July 2015 on official Facebook page. Final poster was revealed on 17 July.

Soundtrack 

Soundtrack of Moor is composed by the Pakistani band, Strings.
Kothbiro by Ayub Ogada is featured in the trailer. The film bought the copyrights. Anwar Maqsood wrote the lyrics of songs. The soundtrack was released on 28 July 2015.

Release 
Moor was premiered in Karachi on 10 August and in Lahore on 13 August whereas film had its red carpet in Rawalpindi the next day. The film was released in cinemas across Pakistan on 14 August 2015 (Independence Day). The film premiered in Dubai on 29 October, while released in cinemas UAE the next day.

Reception

Box office

Critical response
The film was rated good overall by critics. Rafay Mahmood of The Express Tribune praised the film, rated 4 out of 5 stars and wrote "Jami manages to pull off the impossible with Moor. He grants us a true Pakistani film sans being pretentious or preachy and makes the much rural and suburban concept of ‘love for your motherland’ moving for urban audiences." Aayan Mirza of Galaxy Lollywood rated 4/5 and summed up as "Moor is by far the best Pakistani cinema has ever offered in terms of overall execution. What a cinematography, what an acting, and what a music." Adnan Murad of Blasting News rated 3.5/5 stars and verdicts as "A surprisingly engaging mix of reality and substance gives Moor a cult appeal that Pakistani film industry will always cherish. Moor has a swirl of allure and enchantment that sets it apart from other Pakistani films." Elizabeth Kerr of The Hollywood Reporter praised the film at 20th Busan International Film Festival saying, "A gorgeous and intensely contemporary slice of Pakistani life."

Accolades

References

External links
 
 

2015 drama films
2015 films
Films shot in Balochistan, Pakistan
Films scored by Strings
Films shot in Karachi
Films shot in Quetta
Geo Films films
Pakistani drama films
Pashto-language films
2010s Urdu-language films
2015 multilingual films
Pakistani multilingual films